Dorothy Ross may refer to:

 Dorothy Ross (activist) (1928–1998), Australian women's and rural activist
 Dorothy Ross (historian) (b. 1936), American historian of social sciences
 Dorothy Jean Ross (1926–2006), given name of one of the Ross Sisters, a trio of American singers and dancers